Psoquillidae is a family of bird nest barklice in the order Psocodea (formerly Psocoptera). There are about 8 genera and more than 30 described species in Psoquillidae.

Genera
These eight genera belong to the family Psoquillidae:
 Balliella Badonnel, 1949
 Eosilla Ribaga, 1908
 Psoquilla Hagen, 1865
 Rhyopsocidus Smithers & Mockford, 2004
 Rhyopsocoides Garcia Aldrete, 2006
 Rhyopsoculus Garcia Aldrete, 1984
 Rhyopsocus Hagen, 1876
 † Eorhyopsocus Nel, Prokop, De Ploeg & Millet, 2005 Oise amber, France, Ypresian

References

Further reading

 

Trogiomorpha
Articles created by Qbugbot